Googong Dam is a minor ungated earth and rock fill with clay core embankment dam with concrete chute spillway plus a nearby  high earthfill saddle embankment across the Queanbeyan River upstream of Queanbeyan in the Capital Country region of New South Wales, Australia. The dam's purpose includes water supply for Canberra and Queanbeyan. The impounded reservoir is called Googong Reservoir.

Googong Dam was created through enabling legislation enacted via the passage of the Canberra Water Supply (Goodong Dam) Act, 1974.

History 
A green ban was briefly imposed by the Builders Labourers Federation for a few days until adequate assurances that marine life in Lake Burley Griffin would not be harmed.

Location and features
The dam was built by Thiess based on designs developed by the Commonwealth Department of Construction; and is now managed by Icon Water.

At 100% capacity the dam wall holds back  of water at  AHD. The ungated concrete chute spillway is capable of discharging . Staged remedial works were undertaken in the 1980s to protect the eroded structure.

In 2016 with more regular spillway overflows, the dam's managing authority Icon Water, installed a 240m floating safety barrier, with authorised vessel access gate, across the spillway, to improve safety for waterway users.

See also

 List of dams and reservoirs in New South Wales

References

External links
 
 
 

Dams in New South Wales
Earth-filled dams
Dams completed in 1979
Embankment dams
Murray-Darling basin
Green bans